Colly Blue is a locality in the North West Slopes region of New South Wales, Australia.

References

Towns in New South Wales
Liverpool Plains Shire